Sapno Se Bhare Naina (English: Eyes Full Of Dreams) is an Indian soap opera which aired on Star Plus from December  2010 through February 2012.

Plot

The plot centers around the life of Naina Bhardwaj who was raised by her father and stepmother who tended to be very harsh and emotionally cold. Years after her father's death, Naina decides to begin a new life in Mumbai.

On the train to Mumbai she meets Daksh Patwardhan and they get into a minor argument. In Mumbai, Naina attends her friend's wedding and decides to become a wedding planner. At the wedding she runs into Daksh and neither are happy meeting the other. One day Naina meets a sweet friendly woman who finds Naina's open nature endearing and invites Naina to live in her house as a tenant. This woman turns out to be Daksh's mother.

Over time, Naina and Daksh become friends and their friendship eventually turns romantic, even though Daksh has been engaged to Sonakshi and Naina is almost married off to Daksh's cousin.

Later on, Sonakshi's true colors are revealed. Naina and Akruti reveal the truth but in the process, Naina and Daksh's affair is exposed  leading Naina to leave the house. She goes to Anjali's house. Daksh and Akruti miss Naina. Daksh goes to Sonakshi's house to end the relationship but Sonakshi manipulates the situation so that Daksh is forced to get back together with her. He however makes it clear  that he would never marry Sonakshi, after which Sonakshi attempts suicide but is saved. Daksh and Naina are finally married.

Sonakshi tries to kill Naina on Diwali night but her mother is shot instead. It is then revealed that Sonakshi's mother is Naina's biological mother also.

Cast
Parvati Vaze as Naina Patwardhan
Gaurav S Bajaj as Daksh Patwardhan
Pallavi Purohit as Madhura
Payal Rajput as Sonakshi 
Rachana Parulkar as Akruti 
Karan Sharma as Abhi 
Dishank Arora as Aayush
Vaishnavi Mahant as Anjali
Asha Negi as Madhura

References 

StarPlus original programming
Indian television series
2010 Indian television series debuts
2012 Indian television series endings